Westward Ho! is a 1919 British silent historical adventure film directed by Percy Nash and starring Renee Kelly, Charles Quatermaine and Irene Rooke. It is an adaptation of the 1855 novel Westward Ho! by Charles Kingsley, set during the Spanish Armada (1588).

Cast
 Renee Kelly as Rose Salterne 
 Charles Quatermaine as Don Guzman 
 Eric Harrison as Amyas Leigh 
 Booth Conway as Salvation Yeo 
 Irene Rooke as Mistress Leigh 
 Ernest Wallace as John Oxenham 
 Dolly Robbins as Aya Canova 
 Allen Hilton as Frank Leigh 
 J.H. Barnes as Master Salterne

References

Bibliography
 Goble, Alan. The Complete Index to Literary Sources in Film. Walter de Gruyter, 1999.

External links

1919 films
1910s historical adventure films
British historical adventure films
British silent feature films
Films directed by Percy Nash
Seafaring films
Films set in the 1580s
Films set in Tudor England
Films based on British novels
1910s English-language films
1910s British films
Silent historical adventure films
Films based on works by Charles Kingsley